Sir Edward William Brabrook   (10 April 1839 – 20 March 1930) was an English civil servant, author, and anthropologist with a special interest in folklore. He was a member of the Folklore Society and a fellow of Society of Antiquaries of London and was awarded the silver Guy Medal in 1909.

Born in 1839 in London, Brabrook was a lawyer by training and became the senior registrar of friendly societies. He wrote extensively on the law relating to working-class self-help institutions, promoting legal guides for industrial and provident (co-operative) societies, trade unions, and savings banks.  He was appointed a Companion of the Order of the Bath in the 1897 Diamond Jubilee Honours.
 
His works included a proposal for an "Ethnographic Survey of the United Kingdom" put to the British Association for the Advancement of Science, coordinating activities of the Folklore Society, Anthropological Institute and Society of Antiquaries. He was president of the Anthropological Institute in 1895–1897; and president of the London and Middlesex Archaeological Society from 1910 to 1930.

He died in 1930 in Wallington, Surrey and was buried at West Norwood Cemetery.

Bibliography

References

External links 

1839 births
1930 deaths
Companions of the Order of the Bath
English antiquarians
English eugenicists
English anthropologists
Fellows of the Society of Antiquaries of London
Fellows of the Royal Anthropological Institute of Great Britain and Ireland
Burials at West Norwood Cemetery
Presidents of the Royal Anthropological Institute of Great Britain and Ireland
Presidents of the Folklore Society